The Danish Mixed Doubles Curling Championship is the national championship of mixed doubles curling (one man and one woman) in Denmark. It has been held annually since the 2007–2008 season. The championships are organized by the Danish Curling Association.

List of champions and medallists
Team line-ups in order: female, male.

References

See also
Danish Men's Curling Championship
Danish Women's Curling Championship
Danish Mixed Curling Championship
Danish Junior Curling Championships

Curling competitions in Denmark
National curling championships
Recurring sporting events established in 2008
2008 establishments in Denmark
Annual sporting events in Denmark
Mixed doubles curling